WYHA (102.9 FM) is a radio station broadcasting the Bible Broadcasting Network in Grand Rapids, Michigan, United States.

History
Originally WFUR-FM and the sister station to WFUR, the station was constructed on the AM tower site in 1960. The primary reason for construction of WFUR-FM was the early morning and night time audience that WFUR could not reach because at that time, WFUR was only allowed daylight operation (sunrise to sunset). WFUR-FM was the third FM station in the Grand Rapids market. Through the years, WFUR-FM increased power as opportunities became available. The final increase took place in 1983. Agreements were signed with other 102.9 FM stations in Ann Arbor and Milwaukee to accept any interference caused by each of them going to 50,000 watts. WFUR-FM constructed a new, taller  with the antenna at a height above average terrain of 490 ft., and installed a new transmitter (Continental) at that time.

Effective May 11, 2020, WFUR-FM was sold to the Bible Broadcasting Network, and the station changed its call sign to WYHA. As WYHA began carrying Bible Broadcasting Network programming, its former programming continued to air on WFUR and its translator at 92.9 FM.

External links

YHA
Radio stations established in 1960
1960 establishments in Michigan
Bible Broadcasting Network